San Antonio Shopping Center is an outdoor shopping mall located on El Camino Real at San Antonio Road in Mountain View, California. The shopping center consists of two areas, owned by two separate companies.

The namesake San Antonio Shopping Center is a traditional outdoor power center anchored by Trader Joe's, Walmart, and a 24 Hour Fitness gym. It was formerly owned by Federal Realty until the land was sold to the Los Altos School District in late December 2019 for the businesses to eventually be demolished for a neighborhood school for students in the area.

The Village at San Antonio Center is a mixed-use property with apartments, restaurants, and a Safeway supermarket. It is owned by Merlone Geier Partners.

History
Starting in the 1950s, the center was an open-air shopping mall, originally featuring Rhodes and Sears, with a Mervyn's opening later. Over time, the mall was expanded, with the Rhodes converting to Liberty House and finally J.C. Penney and a Best catalog showroom. In the 1970s and 1980s, Atari Games (located nearby) used the Time Zone arcade at the shopping mall to play test all their arcade games.  Most of the mall was demolished and partially reconfigured circa 1995  to make way for Walmart and additional retail shops.

Sears closed its doors in 2010, three years after it had originally announced its departure. Sears and the surrounding strip of retailers were replaced by phase one of The Village, consisting of a Safeway supermarket, apartments, retail, and restaurants. A second phase, anchored by a Showplace ICON cinema, broke ground in 2015.

In 2019, the shopping center was sold to the Los Altos School district to build a new school intended to be closer to nearby students than Covington Elementary School. There were also plans to designate the land as a new site for the Bullis Charter School, which had 2 campuses with portable units serving as classrooms, housed at the district’s two junior high schools, Egan Junior High School and Georgina P. Blach Intermediate School. The original plan was to have the school open by 2023 but the COVID-19 pandemic has since delayed those plans.

References

External links
San Antonio Center
The Village at San Antonio Center

Buildings and structures in Mountain View, California
Shopping malls in the San Francisco Bay Area
Shopping malls in Santa Clara County, California